The Bolbitiaceae are a family of mushroom-forming basidiomycete fungi. A 2008 estimate placed 17 genera and 287 species in the family.  Bolbitiaceae was circumscribed by mycologist Rolf Singer in 1948.

Description
This family is of mushroom-forming species that have a hymenium on gills, brown spores and a hymenoderm pileipellis.

Differences in genera
Bolbitius are mushrooms which are thin, Mycena-like, with gelatinous cap surface. These lack a veil, are saprotrophic, and tend to be found with grass.

Conocybe are mushrooms which are thin, Mycena-like, with a dry cap surface.  These are small and saprotrophic, and tend to be found with grass.  These have cheilocystidia which are capitate.

Pholiotina are mushrooms which are thin, Mycena-like, with a dry cap surface.  These are small and saprotrophic, and tend to be found with grass, and have a veil.  Some have a membranous veil, mid-stipe, 
others the veil breaks up and can be found on the cap margin.  These are separated from Conocybe in that the cheilocystidia are non-capitate.

Descolea includes Pholiotina-like mushrooms that are ectomycorrhizal and have limoniform spores.

See also
List of Agaricales families

References

 
Bolbitiaceae
Taxa named by Rolf Singer